"Easy Lady" is a song by Italian singer Spagna, released in 1986 as the lead single from her debut studio album, Dedicated to the Moon (1987).

Although she and her brother, Theo Spagna, had already composed several songs for artists such as Boney M or Fun Fun, Spagna was known by the general public through this song.

Commercial performance
"Easy Lady" topped the charts in Italy and Spain. The single debuted at number 12 in Switzerland on 31 August 1986, peaking at number two in its fifth week. In France, it debuted at number 38 before peaking at number four for three non-consecutive weeks, spending 10 weeks in the top 10. That same year, the song was certified silver by the Syndicat National de l'Édition Phonographique (SNEP), denoting sales in excess of 250,000 copies. The single has sold 80,000 copies in Italy and 600,000 copies in Europe. Elsewhere, "Easy Lady" reached number 12 in West Germany, number 30 in Austria and number 62 in the United Kingdom.

Track listings

7-inch single
A. "Easy Lady" – 4:08
B. "Jealousy" – 3:52

12-inch single
A. "Easy Lady" – 6:55
B. "Jealousy" – 5:25

12-inch single (club remix)
A. "Easy Lady" (club remix) – 6:40
B. "Jealousy" – 5:25

Italian 12-inch single (Move On Up remix)
A. "Easy Lady" (Move On Up remix) – 6:40
B. "Easy Lady" (instrumental version) – 6:40

European 12-inch single (extended version)
A. "Easy Lady" (extended version) – 6:55
B. "Easy Lady" / "Call Me" (combimix) – 5:50

UK 12-inch single (extended remix)
A. "Easy Lady" (extended mix) – 6:55
B1. "Easy Lady" / "Call Me" (combimix) – 5:50
B2. "Jealousy" – 3:52

UK 12-inch single
A. "Easy Lady" (album mix) – 6:40
B1. "Dance, Dance, Dance" – 4:15
B2. "Jealousy" – 3:52

Charts

Weekly charts

Year-end charts

Certifications

References

1986 debut singles
1986 songs
CBS Records singles
Number-one singles in Italy
Number-one singles in Spain
Songs written by Larry Pignagnoli
Spagna songs
Songs written by Giorgio Spagna